A vergée (alternative spellings vergie,  vrégie) is a unit of land area, a quarter of the old French arpent.  The term derives from Latin virga (rod).  Compare French verge (yard).

In the Channel Islands, it is a standard measure of land, but the statutory definition differs between the bailiwicks.

In France, a vergée was 12,100 square Paris feet (1,276.8 m2), equal to 25 square perches. The surveying perch measured 22 French feet. 
In French North America, it was also equal to 25 square perches, but the royal perch of 18 feet was used, yielding a vergée of 8100 square feet (854.7 m2) 
In Guernsey, a vergée (Guernésiais: vergie) is 17,640 square feet (1,639 m2). It is 40 (square) Guernsey perches. A Guernsey perch (also spelt perque) is 21 feet by 21 feet.
In Jersey, a vergée (Jèrriais: vrégie) is 19,360 square feet (1,798.6 m2). It is 40 (square) Jersey perches. A Jersey perch (also spelt pèrque) is a square 24 pied de perche on each side (i.e. a square 22 imperial feet on each side).

Conversions
1 vergée (Guernsey) is equivalent to:
1 638.80963 m2
0.404958678 acres

1 vergée (Jersey) is equivalent to:
1,798.60285 m2
0.444444444 acres

See also 
Units of measurement in France before the French Revolution
Virgate

References

Channel Islands
Customary units of measurement
Units of area
Standards of France